Elizabeth Whitehead (21 November 1854 – 18 June 1934) was an English painter known for her flower paintings. Her work is in the public collections of the Leamington Spa Art Gallery & Museum and Russell-Cotes Art Gallery & Museum in England and the Musée d'Orsay in Paris.

Whitehead was born in Royal Leamington Spa in 1854, the Whitehead family lived at 3 Lansdowne Terrace. She studied at the Leamington School of Art then travelled to Paris with her brother Frederick Whitehead to attend the Académie Julian. She exhibited at the Royal Academy of Arts and the Society of British Artists.

Whitehead died in Leamington on 18 June 1934.

External links 
 A selection of works by or after Elizabeth Whitehead on Art UK

References 

1854 births
1934 deaths
People from Leamington Spa
English women painters
19th-century English women artists
20th-century English women artists
19th-century English painters
20th-century English painters